The alba ("sunrise") is a genre of Old Occitan lyric poetry. It describes the longing of lovers who, having passed a night together, must separate for fear of being discovered.

A common figure found in the alba is the guaita ("sentry" or "guard"), a friend who alerts the lovers when the hour has come to separate. The lovers often accuse the guaita of dozing, being inattentive or separating them too early. The lovers fear not just the lady's husband but also the lauzengiers, the jealous rival.

The following example, composed by an anonymous troubadour, describes the longing of a knight for his lady as they part company after a night of forbidden love. Though generally representative of the style, this particular verse uses an atypical strophic pattern.

Under the influence of the Occitan troubadours, the Minnesingers developed a similar genre, the Tagelied, in Germany, and in northern France the trouvères developed an equivalent aube genre. The alba itself was imported into the Galician-Portuguese trovadorismo movement, but only one example of it, by Nuno Fernandes Torneol, survives.

In 1263, as a counterpart to the alba, Guiraut Riquier composed a song he called a serena (evening song), in which a lover complains about waiting for the evening.

List of Occitan albas
Only 18 albas are known.

See also 
Aubade
Tagelied

References 

Western medieval lyric forms
Occitan literary genres